All Fired Up is the second studio album by heavy metal band Fastway. It was released in 1984. It is the last album recorded with Jerry Shirley on drums and also with Eddie Kramer as producer.

Overview 
In 1984, Fastway recorded again with Eddie Kramer their next album, with the former Taste bassist Charlie McCracken (his only contribution to the band). A music video for the title-track, was released and it soon received distribution through various TV channels like MTV and VH1. The sound of the LP is more blues-based than their previous album and ended up with more melodic elements. All Fired Up had received good reviews, but failed to reach more success due to increasing popularity of glam metal in the charts that same year. To support the album, Fastway opened for Rush on their Grace Under Pressure tour.

After the hardships of touring, Shirley and McCracken left the band in 1985.

Track listing
All song written and composed by Fastway.

Personnel
Fastway
 Dave King - lead vocals.
 'Fast' Eddie Clarke - guitar.
 Charlie McCracken - bass guitar.
 Jerry Shirley - drums.

Production
Eddie Kramer - producer, engineer, mixing, remixing at the Record Plant, Los Angeles
Tim Hunt - engineer, mixing at Townhouse Studios , London
Julian Wheatley - tape operator
Owen Davies, Ben Kape, Dave Wittman, Tom Swift - assistant engineers
George Marino - mastering at Sterling Sound, New York
Jo Mirowski, Torchlight, London - cover design.
Chris Moore - illustration.
Allan Ballard - photography.
Simon Cantwell - art direction.

References

1984 albums
Fastway (band) albums
Albums produced by Eddie Kramer
Columbia Records albums
New Wave of British Heavy Metal albums